Pietroiu may refer to several places in Romania:

Pietroiu, a village in Vădeni Commune, Brăila County
Pietroiu, a village in Borcea Commune, Călăraşi County